{{Infobox award
| name           = Zee Cine Award for Best Actor (Popular)
| image = AnupamKher5.jpg
| caption = The 2023 recipient: Anupam Kher
| awarded_for    = Best Performance by an Actor in a Leading Role
| presenter      = Zee Entertainment Enterprises
| country        = India
| year           = Shah Rukh Khan,  Dil To Pagal Hai (1998) 
| holder         = Anupam Kher  The Kashmir Files (2023)
| website        = Zee Cine Awards (from the web archive (7 Nov 2020)
}}

The Zee Cine Award for Best Actor – Male is chosen by the viewers of Zee Entertainment Enterprises as part of its annual award ceremony for Hindi films, to recognise a male actor who has delivered an outstanding performance in a leading role. Following its inception in 1998, a ceremony was not held in 2009 and 2010, but resumed back in 2011. Shah Rukh Khan, with seven awards holds the record of the maximum wins in this category.

† - indicates the performance also won the Filmfare Award
‡ - indicates the performance was also nominated'' for the Filmfare Award

Superlatives

Multiple Winners
7 Wins : Shah Rukh Khan
3 Wins : Hrithik Roshan – Salman Khan
2 Wins : Aamir Khan

List of winners and nominees

1990s

2000s

2010s

2020s

See also
 Zee Cine Awards
 Bollywood
 Cinema of India

References

Best Actor- Male